ISCA or Isca may refer to:

ISCA, a four letter abbreviation which may be one of: 
 ISCABBS, a bulletin board system at the University of Iowa
 Indian Science Congress Association
 International Sea Cadet Association
 Islamic Supreme Council of America
 International Symposium on Computer Architecture
 International Scouting Collectors Association
 International Speech Communication Association
 International Sport and Culture Association
 Institute of Singapore Chartered Accountants
 International Society of Caricature Artists
 International Society of Copier Artists
 Israeli Students Combating Antisemitism
 Infrastructure Sustainability Council of Australia

Isca, any of several places in Roman Britain, derived from a Brythonic word for "flowing water":
Isca Dumnoniorum, modern Exeter
Isca Augusta, modern Caerleon
Isca, the River Usk

Isca, a place in Calabria, Italy:
Isca sullo Ionio
Isca Marina

Other meanings:
Isca, a village in Meteș Commune, Alba County, Romania
Alternate transliteration of Iscah, daughter of Haran
Isca Academy

See also
Iska (disambiguation)